The Queen Anne's County Courthouse is the oldest courthouse still in use in the state of Maryland. The building houses the judge for the Queen Anne's County Circuit Court, the judge's chambers, a courtroom, a jurors' assembly room, clerks offices and a small detention lock-up.

History 
The courthouse was authorized by acts of the Maryland General Assembly after the removal of the county seat from Queenstown to Chester Mills and then Centreville.  It was erected between 1791 and 1796 on land purchased from Elizabeth Nicholson from her portion of the Chesterfield Estate, the estate of her grandfather, William Sweatman. Later, her father, Judge Nicholson became Chief Judge of the Sixth Judicial Circuit (then comprising Baltimore and Harford counties) and a judge of the Court of Appeals.

References

County courthouses in Maryland
Buildings and structures in Queen Anne's County, Maryland